Rockford's Rock Opera is an ecological musical story created by Matthew Sweetapple, Steve Punt and Elaine Sweetapple. It was first released on the Internet and also as a three-album set by Sweetapple in 2010.

Rockford's Rock Opera uses audio visual resources, CGI animation (created by Steve Skinner) and an audiobook story to teach about extinction, ecology and biodiversity. As a result, it has been promoted by education portals, including the BGCI, Woodland's Junior School, Teachernet and Primary Times.  It has also been featured on BBC Radio – including a musical feature on BBC Radio 4's Go4it programme.

Rockford's Rock Opera introduces the Island of Infinity, home to the last single representative of every extinct animal and plant species. Key characters include the fictional Cocklebur Ick (named after the cocklebur seed - inspiration for the invention of Velcro), the Registrar, Dectopus, Feeble Beetle and The Herculous. Also featured are non fictional species such as the passenger pigeon, great auk, moa and thylacine.

Rockford's Rock Opera is described as an "Adventure in Sound," citing influences such as Hitchhikers Guide to the Galaxy, Jeff Wayne's Musical Version of The War of the Worlds, Roger Glover's Butterfly Ball and Harry Nilssen's The Point!. Delivered via the web and on CD, Rockford's Rock Opera was described by The Observer as "Magical", by The Guardian as an "ingenious story" and a "thoroughly modern musical" and, by The Times, as a "cult favourite as beloved as Wallace and Gromit."  The musical story's on-line and on-mobile formats allow visitors access a variety of free audio visual materials and resources as well as different story formats (including text synchronized readalong, pdf and audio downloads). On Apple and Android Rockford's Rock Opera is available as an app for phones and tablets.

In addition, Rockford's Rock Opera's ecological messages and content have led to cooperative links with environmental organisations and charities including the WWF, Buglife the BGCI and the Open University.

In addition to many school performances, Rockford's Rock Opera (Part One) has been performed live on stage at various venues including the Museum of London and The Bull Theatre in London.

History 

Rockford's Rock Opera grew from the success of a Sweetapple song released with the help of Gerry Bron on behalf of Battersea Dogs and Cats Home  called "Rockford's Christmas" which entered the UK singles chart in 2004.

Rockford's Rock Opera Part 1 was first performed live at The Bull Theatre, High Barnet on Friday, 29 January 2010.

The cast included:
Steve Punt as the Narrator,
Matthew Sweetaple as the Guitarist/Narrator,
Zoe Karp as Cocklebur Ick and
Danny Lane as Iggy the passenger pigeon

References

External links
Rockford's Rock Opera website
Woodlands Junior School Education Portal
Teachernet UK Government Education Portal
BGCI Education Portal
The Times Review
The Guardian Review
The Observer Review
Primary Times Magazine Educational Review
Observer Article about the original Rockford's Christmas single release.
Times Article about Sweetapple

Rock operas
Audiobooks by title or series
2008 musicals